Joseph Harry Rantz (March 31, 1914 – September 10, 2007) was an American rower who won Olympic gold in the men's eight at the 1936 Summer Olympics.

Early life
Born in Spokane, Washington, Joe Rantz had a harsh childhood in Boulder City, Idaho and later Sequim, Washington. His mother Nellie Maxwell (1881–1918) died from throat cancer when Rantz was just four. His father Harry Rantz (1880–1966) remarried in 1921 but Rantz did not connect well with his stepmother Thula LaFollete (1897–1935) who struggled to raise Rantz and her four younger natural children. From age 15 Rantz reared himself in an unfinished house abandoned by his father and stepmother and put himself through high school. He gained admission to the University of Washington.

Rowing and later career
Rantz rowed in the University of Washington senior varsity eights which won US national Intercollegiate Rowing Association titles in 1936 and 1937 as well as the victorious sophomore eight of 1935 and freshman eight of 1934.   Rantz is the central character in the non-fiction book The Boys in the Boat, which inspired the PBS documentary American Experience: The Boys of '36. Both chronicle his struggles through life in his early years, culminating with his Olympic gold medal win from the seven seat of the US men's eight at Berlin in 1936.

Rantz earned a chemical engineering degree from the University and worked for Boeing following his retirement from rowing. He died of congestive heart failure in Redmond, Washington, at age 93.

References

External links
 
 
 
 

1914 births
2007 deaths
American male rowers
Rowers at the 1936 Summer Olympics
Olympic gold medalists for the United States in rowing
University of Washington alumni
Sportspeople from Spokane, Washington
Medalists at the 1936 Summer Olympics